In mathematics, integral equations are equations in which an unknown function appears under an integral sign. In mathematical notation, integral equations may thus be expressed as being of the form: where  is an integral operator acting on u. Hence, integral equations may be viewed as the analog to differential equations where instead of the equation involving derivatives, the equation contains integrals. A direct comparison can be seen with the mathematical form of the general integral equation above with the general form of a differential equation which may be expressed as follows:where  may be viewed as a differential operator of order i. Due to this close connection between differential and integral equations, one can often convert between the two. For example, one method of solving a boundary value problem is by converting the differential equation with its boundary conditions into an integral equation and solving the integral equation. In addition, Because one can convert between the two, differential equations in physics such as Maxwell's equations often have an analog integral and differential form. See also, for example, Green's function and Fredholm theory.

Classification and overview
Various classification methods for integral equations exist. A few standard classifications include distinctions between linear and nonlinear; homogenous and inhomogenous; Fredholm and Volterra; first order, second order, and third order; and singular and regular integral equations. These distinctions usually rest on some fundamental property such as the consideration of the linearity of the equation or the homogeneity of the equation. These comments are made concrete through the following definitions and examples:

Linearity 
: An integral equation is linear if the unknown function u(x) and its integrals appear linear in the equation. Hence, an example of a linear equation would be:As a note on naming convention: i) u(x) is called the unknown function, ii) f(x) is called a known function, iii) K(x,t) is a function of two variables and often called the Kernel function, and iv) λ is an unknown factor or parameter, which plays the same role as the eigenvalue in linear algebra.

: An integral equation is nonlinear if the unknown function u(x) or any of its integrals appear nonlinear in the equation. A selection of such equations are:

 Nonlinear Volterra integral equations of the second kind which have the general form:   where  is a known function.
 Nonlinear Fredholm integral equations of the second kind which have the general form: .
 A special type of nonlinear Fredholm integral equations of the second kind are given by the form: , which has the two special subclasses:
 Urysohn equation: .
 Hammerstein equation: .

More information on the Hammerstein equation and different versions of the Hammerstein equation can be found in the Hammerstein section below.

Location of the unknown equation 
: An integral equation is called an integral equation of the first kind if the unknown function appears only under the integral sign. An example would be: .

: An integral equation is called an integral equation of the second kind if the unknown function appears also outside the integral.

: An integral equation is called an integral equation of the third kind if it is a linear Integral equation of the following form:where g(t) vanishes at least once in the interval [a,b] or where g(t) vanishes at a finite number of points in (a,b).

Limits of Integration 
Fredholm: An integral equation is called a Fredholm integral equation if both of the limits of integration in all integrals are fixed and constant. Hence, the following two examples are Fredholm equations:
 Fredholm equation of the first type: .
 Fredholm equation of the second type: 
Note that we can express integral equations such as those above also using integral operator notation. For example, we can define the Fredholm integral operator as:Hence, the above Fredholm equation of the second kind may be written compactly as:

: An integral equation is called a Volterra integral equation if at least one of the limits of integration is a variable. Hence, the integral is taken over a domain varying with the variable of integration. Examples of Volterra equations would be: 
 Volterrra integral equation of the first kind: 
 Volterrra integral equation of the second kind: 
As with Fredholm equations, we can again adopt operator notation. Thus, we can define the linear Volterra integral operator , as follows:where  and K(t,s) is called the kernel and must be continuous on the interval . In addition, a linear Volterra integral equation of the second kind for an unknown function  and a given continuous function  on the interval  where :: In higher dimensions, integral equations such as Fredholm-Volterra integral equations (VFIE) exist. The Fredholm-Volterrra Integral Operator  is defined as:

Note that while throughout this article, the bounds of the integral are usually written as intervals, this need not be the case. In general, integral equations don't always need to be defined over an interval , but could also be defined over a curve or surface.

Homogeneity 
: An integral equation is called homogeneous if the known function  is identically zero.

: An integral equation is called homogeneous if the known function  is nonzero.

Regularity 
: An integral equation is called regular if the integrals used are all proper integrals.

 or : An integral equation is called singular or weakly singular if the integral is an improper integral. This could be either because at least one of the limits of integration is infinite or the kernel becomes unbounded, meaning infinite, on at least one point in the interval or domain over which is being integrated.

Another example of a singular integral equation in which the kernel becomes unbounded is: This equation is a special form of the more general weakly singular Volterra integral equation of the first kind, called Abel's integral equation: : An integral equation is called strongly singular if the integral is defined by a special regularisation, for example, by the Cauchy principal value.

Integro-differential equations 
An Integro-differential equation, as the name suggests, combines differential and integral operators into one equation. There are many version including the Volterra integro-differential equation and delay type equations as defined below. For example, using the Volterra operator as defined above, the Volterra integro-differential equation may be written as:For delay problems, we can define the delay integral operator  as:where the delay integro-differential equation may be expressed as:

Volterra integral equations

Uniqueness and existence theorems in 1D 
The solution to a linear Volterra integral equation of the first kind, given by the equation:can be described by the following uniqueness and existence theorem. Recall that the Volterra integral operator , can be defined as follows:where  and K(t,s) is called the kernel and must be continuous on the interval . 

The solution to a linear Volterra integral equation of the second kind, given by the equation:can be described by the following uniqueness and existence theorem.

Volterra integral equations in  
This integral equation has a unique solution  given by:where  is the resolvent kernel of K.

Uniqueness and existence theorems of Fredhom-Volterra equations 
With this in mind, we can now introduce the following theorem:

Special Volterra equations 

Converting IVP to integral equations 
In the following section, we give an example of how to convert an initial value problem (IVP) into an integral equation. There are multiple motivations for doing so, among them being that integral equations can often be more readily solvable and are more suitable for proving existence and uniqueness theorems.

The following example was provided by Wazwaz on pages 1 and 2 in his book. We examine the IVP given by the equation:

and the initial condition:

If we integrate both sides of the equation, we get:

and by the fundamental theorem of calculus, we obtain:

Rearranging the equation above, we get the integral equation:

which is a Volterra integral equation of the form:

where K(x,t) is called the kernel and equal to 2t, and f(x)=1.

Power series solution for integral equations
In many cases, if the Kernel of the integral equation is of the form  and the Mellin transform of  exists, we can find the solution of the integral equation

in the form of a power series

where

Numerical solution 
It is worth noting that integral equations often do not have an analytical solution, and must be solved numerically. An example of this is evaluating the electric-field integral equation (EFIE) or magnetic-field integral equation (MFIE) over an arbitrarily shaped object in an electromagnetic scattering problem.

One method to solve numerically requires discretizing variables and replacing integral by a quadrature rule

Then we have a system with  equations and  variables. By solving it we get the value of the  variables

Integral equations as a generalization of eigenvalue equations
Certain homogeneous linear integral equations can be viewed as the continuum limit of eigenvalue equations. Using index notation, an eigenvalue equation can be written as

This gives a linear homogeneous Fredholm equation of the second type.

In general,  can be a distribution, rather than a function in the strict sense. If the distribution  has support only at the point , then the integral equation reduces to a differential eigenfunction equation.

In general, Volterra and Fredholm integral equations can arise from a single differential equation, depending on which sort of conditions are applied at the boundary of the domain of its solution.

Wiener–Hopf integral equations

Originally, such equations were studied in connection with problems in radiative transfer, and more recently, they have been related to the solution of boundary integral equations for planar problems in which the boundary is only piecewise smooth.

Hammerstein equations 
A Hammerstein equation is a nonlinear first-kind Volterra integral equation of the form:Under certain regularity conditions, the equation is equivalent to the implicit Volterra integral equation of the second-kind:where:The equation may however also be expressed in operator form which motivates the definition of the following operator called the nonlinear Volterra-Hammerstein operator:Here  is a smooth function while the kernel K may be continuous, i.e. bounded, or weakly singular. The corresponding second-kind Volterra integral equation called the Volterra-Hammerstein Integral Equation of the second kind, or simply Hammerstein equation for short, can be expressed as:In certain applications, the nonlinearity of the function G may be treated as being only semi-linear in the form of:In this case, we the following semi-linear Volterra integral equation:In this form, we can state an existence and uniqueness theorem for the semi-linear Hammerstein integral equation. 

We can also write the Hammerstein equation using a different operator called the Niemytzki operator, or substitution operator,  defined as follows:More about this can be found on page 75 of this book.

Applications 
Integral equations are important in many applications. Problems in which integral equations are encountered include radiative transfer, and the oscillation of a string, membrane, or axle. Oscillation problems may also be solved as differential equations.
Actuarial science (ruin theory)
Computational electromagnetics
Boundary element method
Inverse problems
Marchenko equation (inverse scattering transform)
 Options pricing under jump-diffusion
Radiative transfer
Viscoelasticity
Fluid mechanics

See also
 Differential equation
 Integro-differential equation
 Ruin theory
 Volterra integral equation

Bibliography 

 Agarwal, Ravi P., and Donal O'Regan. Integral and Integrodifferential Equations: Theory, Method and Applications. Gordon and Breach Science Publishers, 2000.
 Brunner, Hermann. Collocation Methods for Volterra Integral and Related Functional Differential Equations. Cambridge University Press, 2004.
 Burton, T. A. Volterra Integral and Differential Equations. Elsevier, 2005.
 Chapter 7 It Mod 02-14-05 - Ira A. Fulton College of Engineering. https://www.et.byu.edu/~vps/ET502WWW/NOTES/CH7m.pdf.
 Corduneanu, C. Integral Equations and Applications. Cambridge University Press, 2008.
 Hackbusch, Wolfgang. Integral Equations Theory and Numerical Treatment. Birkhäuser, 1995.
 Hochstadt, Harry. Integral Equations. Wiley-Interscience/John Wiley & Sons, 1989.
 "Integral Equation." From Wolfram MathWorld, https://mathworld.wolfram.com/IntegralEquation.html.
 "Integral Equation." Integral Equation - Encyclopedia of Mathematics, https://encyclopediaofmath.org/wiki/Integral_equation.
 Jerri, Abdul J. Introduction to Integral Equations with Applications. Sampling Publishing, 2007.
 Pipkin, A. C. A Course on Integral Equations. Springer-Verlag, 1991.
 Polëiìanin A. D., and Alexander V. Manzhirov. Handbook of Integral Equations. Chapman & Hall/CRC, 2008.
 Wazwaz, Abdul-Majid. A First Course in Integral Equations. World Scientific, 2015.

References

Further reading 

  Kendall E. Atkinson The Numerical Solution of Integral Equations of the Second Kind. Cambridge Monographs on Applied and Computational Mathematics, 1997.
  George Arfken and Hans Weber. Mathematical Methods for Physicists. Harcourt/Academic Press, 2000.
 Harry Bateman (1910) History and Present State of the Theory of Integral Equations, Report of the British Association.
  Andrei D. Polyanin and Alexander V. Manzhirov Handbook of Integral Equations. CRC Press, Boca Raton, 1998. .
 E. T. Whittaker and G. N. Watson. A Course of Modern Analysis Cambridge Mathematical Library.
  M. Krasnov, A. Kiselev, G. Makarenko, Problems and Exercises in Integral Equations, Mir Publishers, Moscow, 1971

External links
 Integral Equations: Exact Solutions at EqWorld: The World of Mathematical Equations.
 Integral Equations: Index at EqWorld: The World of Mathematical Equations.
 
Integral Equations (MIT OpenCourseWare)